Beylice (formerly Manaz) is a village in Tarsus district of Mersin Province, Turkey. It is situated in the southern slopes of the Taurus Mountains. The population of Beylice was 971 as of 2011. The village was founded by Yörüks (once nomadic Turkmens) and the former name of the village is thought to refer to a Yörük leader named Manas.

References

Villages in Tarsus District